Newpax Records was a record label focused on Christian folk, pop, and light rock. It was created by  Gary Paxton. It was active during the period 1975–1985. It had at least 83 releases during that period.

The Newpax roster included such performers as Don Francisco.

NewPax was associated with Paragon Records. Both were distributed by Word Records until 1980. Subsequently, they were distributed by Benson Records.

Notes

American record labels